DNA polymerase lambda, also known as Pol λ, is an enzyme found in all eukaryotes. In humans, it is encoded by the POLL gene.

Function 

Pol λ is a member of the X family of DNA polymerases.  It is thought to resynthesize missing nucleotides during non-homologous end joining (NHEJ), a pathway of DNA double-strand break (DSB) repair. NHEJ is the main pathway in higher eukaryotes for repair of DNA DSBs.  Chromosomal DSBs are the most severe type of DNA damage.  During NHEJ, duplexes generated by the alignment of broken DNA ends usually contain small gaps that need to be filled in by a DNA polymerase.  DNA polymerase lambda can perform this function.

The crystal structure of pol λ shows that, unlike the DNA polymerases that catalyze DNA replication, pol λ makes extensive contacts with the 5' phosphate of the downstream DNA strand.  This allows the polymerase to stabilize the two ends of a double-strand break and explains how pol λ is uniquely suited for a role in non-homologous end joining.

In addition to NHEJ, pol λ can also participate in base excision repair (BER), where it provides backup activity in the absence of Pol β.  BER is the major pathway for repair of small base damages resulting from alkylation, oxidation, depurination/depyrimidination, and deamination of DNA.

Besides its catalytic polymerase domain, pol λ has an 8 kDa domain and a BRCT domain.  The 8 kDa domain has lyase activity that can remove a 5' deoxyribosephosphate group from the end of a strand break.  The BRCT domain is a phosphopeptide binding domain that is common among DNA repair proteins and is likely involved in coordinating protein-protein interactions.  Pol λ is structurally and functionally related to pol μ, another member of the X family that also participates in non-homologous end joining.  Like pol μ, pol λ participates in V(D)J recombination, the process by which B-cell and T-cell receptor diversity is generated in the vertebrate immune system.  Whereas pol μ is important for heavy-chain rearrangements, pol λ seems to be more important for light-chain rearrangements.  The yeast Saccharomyces cerevisiae has a single homolog of both pol λ and pol μ called Pol4.

Translesion synthesis is a damage tolerance mechanism in which specialized DNA polymerases substitute for replicative polymerases in copying across DNA damages during replication.  DNA polymerase lambda appears to be involved in translesion synthesis of abasic sites and 8-oxodG damages.

Interactions 

Pol λ has been shown to interact with PCNA.

References 

DNA repair
DNA-binding proteins